Bela Badea (born February 21, 1969, Aiud, Romania) is a Romanian chess player. He got his grandmaster (GM) title in 1999. He performed under the name of Takacs until 1989.

In the Romanian individual championships he won 4 medals: two gold (1997, 1998) and two bronze (1988, 2005). He represented Romania in the 1990 and 2000 chess Olympiads.

Notable Tournaments

References 

1969 births
Living people
Romanian chess players
Chess grandmasters
Chess Olympiad competitors
People from Aiud